Sir Mark Ellis Powell Jones  (born 5 February 1951) is a British art historian, numismatist and museum director. He was Master of St Cross College, Oxford, from 2011-2016. Previously, from 2001 to 2011, he was director of the Victoria and Albert Museum.

Early life
Jones was born on 5 February 1951. He is the son of John Ernest Powell-Jones (or Powell-Jones) and writer/historian, Ann Paludan, and grand nephew of actor Robert Newton. He was educated at Eton College, an all-boys public school in Eton, Berkshire. 

He studied Politics, Philosophy and Economics at Worcester College, Oxford. He then undertook postgraduate studies in art history at the Courtauld Institute of Art, graduating with a Master of Arts (MA) degree.

Career
Jones spent 18 years in the Department of Coins and Medals at the British Museum, where he curated the acclaimed exhibition FAKE? The Art of Deception. 

In 1992, he was appointed director of the National Museums of Scotland, and here he gained a high reputation. He oversaw the creation in 1998 of the Museum of Scotland, which went on to win 22 prizes for its displays and a Stirling Prize nomination for its building.

In May 2001, Jones became Director of the Victoria and Albert Museum. On his first day as director, he announced the scrapping of entry charges to the museum. Under his directorship, a number of renewal projects have been completed, including the Medieval and Renaissance galleries which opened in 2009.

On 18 November 2010, it was announced that Jones had been elected as the next Master of St Cross College, Oxford; he took up the post in September 2011. He retired from the post in September 2016, and was succeeded by Carole Souter.

Jones is Chairman of the National Museum Directors’ Conference, a trustee of the National Trust, the Gilbert Collection, and the Pilgrim Trust, a member of the Court and Council of the Royal College of Art, Vice President of the British Art Medal Society and the Kensington & Chelsea Decorative & Fine Arts Society, and a patron of the Embroiderers' Guild and the Heritage Crafts Association.

Personal life
He is married to Dr Camilla Toulmin, the former director of the International Institute for Environment and Development. They have three children and Jones has a daughter from a previous marriage.

Honours

Fellow of the Society of Antiquaries of London (FSA). (7 March 1992)
Fellow of the Royal Society of Edinburgh (FRSE). (1999)
Knight Bachelor (2010 New Year Honours) "for services to the Arts".
Honorary Doctorate, Royal Holloway College
Honorary Doctorate, Dundee University
Honorary Doctorate, University of Abertay (Dundee) 
Honorary Doctorate, University of East Anglia

References

External links
 . Accessed 25 May 2011

1951 births
Living people
Alumni of Worcester College, Oxford
Alumni of the Courtauld Institute of Art
Directors of the Victoria and Albert Museum
Masters of St Cross College, Oxford
Fellows of the Royal Society of Edinburgh
Fellows of the Society of Antiquaries of London
British art historians
Knights Bachelor
People educated at Eton College
Employees of the British Museum